Jin Keyu (born 13 November 1982) is a Chinese economist, associate professor of economics at the London School of Economics and a World Economic Forum Young Global Leader, specialising in international macroeconomics and the Chinese economy. Her research focuses on global trade imbalances, global asset prices and China's economic growth model.

Personal life 
Jin was born in Beijing, China. At the age of 14, Jin moved to New York to attend Horace Mann School
 and later to Cambridge, Massachusetts to attend Harvard University, where she received her B.A., M.A. and PhD. Jin currently resides in London.

Education and work 
Jin received her B.A. in economics from Harvard University in 2004, and was awarded the Allyn A. Young Prize in Economics for her thesis. She continued her studies for her M.A. and received her Ph.D. in economics from Harvard University in 2009.  Her research focuses on global imbalances and global asset prices, drivers of China's growth model, the impact of the one-child policy and the Chinese saving puzzle.

Between 2009 and 2016, she was an assistant professor of economics at the London School of Economics, before becoming an associate professor. Jin was named Young Global Leader by the World Economic Forum in 2014. Jin was also a visiting professor at Yale University on the Cowles Fellowship from September to December 2012 as well as at UC Berkeley from January to May 2015.

Jin has advised and consulted for the World Bank, the International Monetary Fund, and the Federal Reserve Bank of New York.  She also has had experience at various financial institutions including Goldman Sachs, JP Morgan and Morgan Stanley. She is a columnist for Project Syndicate and Caixin Magazine, and has contributed opinion pieces to media outlets like the Financial Times and the South China Morning Post. Jin also serves as a non-executive director to Richemont Group, the world's second-largest luxury goods company. She worked with a working committee for China Banking Regulatory Commission on Fintech and previously sat on editorial board of the Review of Economic Studies.

References

External links

Living people
Economists from Beijing
Academics of the London School of Economics
Harvard College alumni
High School Affiliated to Renmin University of China alumni
Chinese women academics
Chinese women economists
21st-century Chinese women writers
21st-century Chinese economists
1982 births